Archithosia duplicata is a moth of the subfamily Arctiinae. It was described by Sven Jorgen R. Birket-Smith in 1965. It is found in Cameroon and Nigeria.

References

Moths described in 1965
Lithosiini
Insects of Cameroon
Insects of West Africa
Moths of Africa